Volleyball events were contested at the 1994 Asian Games in Hiroshima, Japan from 3 October to 16 October 1994 at the Green Arena.

Schedule

Medalists

Medal table

Final standing

Men

Women

References
 Men's Results
 Women's Results

External links
 Official website

 
1994 Asian Games events
1994
Asian Games
1994 Asian Games